The 5th World Festival of Youth and Students featured an athletics competition among its programme of events. The events were contested in Warsaw, Poland in August 1955. Mainly contested among Eastern European athletes, it served as an alternative to the more Western European-oriented 1955 Summer International University Sports Week held in San Sebastián the same year.

Following the one-off stand-alone athletics tournament held by the Union Internationale des Étudiants (the 1954 World Student Games), the resumption of the UIE athletics tournament within the World Festival marked a return to top level competitions. The men's winners of the 1954 European Athletics Championships were greatly represented at the competition, with the eleven champions being: Ardalion Ignatyev, Lajos Szentgáli, Emil Zátopek, Yevgeniy Bulanchik, Anatoliy Yulin, Josef Doležal, Ödön Földessy, Leonid Shcherbakov, Mikhail Krivonosov, Janusz Sidło and Vasili Kuznetsov. Triple jumper Leonid Shcherbakov retained his position as the sole man to win that event at the festival; extending his streak from 1949, his fourth straight win at the festival made him the most successful individual male athlete of the competition's history.

In the women's events, the appearance of Australia's Shirley Strickland (a 1952 Olympic champion) added a global element to the normally European contests. She won both the 100 metres and 80 metres hurdles events, as well as taking the 200 metres bronze. Women's European champion Nina Otkalenko won the 800 metres, while reigning Olympic champion Nina Ponomaryova won her fourth straight discus throw title at this competition (only one of two women ever to achieve that feat at the competition, after Iolanda Balaș). Fellow Soviet Olympic champion Galina Zybina took her third world student title in the shot put. Aleksandra Chudina took her ninth career title at the tournament across all events, winning in the javelin throw. Iolanda Balaș won the high jump, following her win at the 1954 World Student Games, and fellow 1954 winner Ursula Donath won the 400 metres in Warsaw.

Medal summary

Men

Women

Medal table

References

Results
World Student Games (UIE). GBR Athletics. Retrieved on 2014-12-09.

World Festival of Youth and Students
World Festival of Youth and Students
World Festival of Youth and Students
Sports competitions in Warsaw
1955
International athletics competitions hosted by Poland